Judgment sample, or Expert sample, is a type of non-random sample that is selected based on the opinion of an expert. Results obtained from a judgment sample are subject to some degree of bias, due to the frame and population not being identical. The frame is a list of all the units, items, people, etc., that define the population to be studied.
Judgement sampling is the noble to provide detailed information about the difficulties in obtaining the distinction. A random sample would provide less bias, but potentially less raw information. 
The downfalls of this system are significant as any non-random sample brings bias into question, which limits the types of statistical analyses that you may reasonably perform, and there are considerable limits to an experts ability to choose a good sample.

References

Sampling (statistics)